Baco, officially the Municipality of Baco,  is a 3rd class municipality in the province of Oriental Mindoro, Philippines. According to the 2020 census, it has a population of 69,817 people.

Geography
Baco is located in the northern part of Oriental Mindoro.

Climate

Barangays

Baco is politically subdivided into 27 barangays.

Demographics

Economy

References

External links
Baco Profile at PhilAtlas.com
[ Philippine Standard Geographic Code]
Philippine Census Information
Local Governance Performance Management System

Municipalities of Oriental Mindoro